
David Tristram (born , Quarry Bank, UK) is an English comic playwright. He has published 29 plays and comedy novels, and produced and directed three films. Widely performed by amateur and professional groups, his plays have parodied such pop-culture genres as soap operas and detective stories.

Educated at Dudley Grammar School and Birmingham University, where he studied English and music, Tristram was a commercial copywriter before turning to comedy. In 1985 he founded the Flying Ducks Theatre Company, which has now become a professional touring company. The enterprise has expanded into the Flying Ducks Group, which stages conferences and other events, provides audio-visual and Internet production services, and represents actors.

Tristram's plays take a farcical view of sex, alcohol, drugs, crime, and theatre itself. Tristram claims he writes only comedy because he cannot take himself too seriously. He usually tests his new work at a small theatre in Bridgnorth near his home in Highley before wider release. His plays have been performed in South Africa, New Zealand, Mexico and Europe among other locations.

His 2015 film Doreen includes cameo appearances from Robert Plant, Nick Owen, and Steve Bull.

Books
2006 A Bolt from the Blue 
2014 Doreen - From Rug-Rats to Riches: Autobiography of a Lazy Cow

Films
2011 Inspector Drake: The Movie
2012 Inspector Drake 2: The Seagull
2015 Doreen: The Movie

References

External links
David Tristram's website: 
Brief biographical newspaper story on David Tristram

1957 births
Living people
People from Dudley
Alumni of the University of Birmingham
English dramatists and playwrights